Brenno  is a village in the administrative district of Gmina Wijewo, within Leszno County, Greater Poland Voivodeship, in west-central Poland.

The village has an approximate population of 1,200.

References

Villages in Leszno County